Charles Schultz was a politician and member of the Wisconsin State Assembly, representing the 2nd District of Winnebago County, Wisconsin. A Democrat, he was elected in 1912. He was born on January 18, 1858, in Harrison, Ohio. He died in 1928.

References

People from Harrison, Ohio
People from Winnebago County, Wisconsin
Democratic Party members of the Wisconsin State Assembly
1858 births
1928 deaths